= Sanroku Station =

Sanroku Station (山麓駅) is the name of two train stations in Japan:

- Sanroku Station (Fukuoka)
- Sanroku Station (Tokyo)
